Georges-Louis Bouchez (GLB), (born March 23, 1986) is a Belgian politician and lawyer. Since 2019 he has served as a Senator and leader of Mouvement réformateur.

Early life 
Bouchez was born in Frameries on March 23, 1986 to modest, self-employed parents. His grandparents were soldiers and mine workers originally from Italy. He grew up in Colfontaine and Quaregnon, and attended l’École des Cannoniers in Mons from 1992-1998 and Collège Saint Stanislas in Mons for his secondary studies, where he graduated in 2004.

Bouchez studied law with a minor in political science at the Université Saint-Louis - Bruxelles from 2004 to 2007 and received his Master's in public law from the Université libre de Bruxelles two years later. His dissertation, under the guidance of Prof Marc Uyttendaele, was entitled « Suite à la polémique de l’affaire Fortis : Jusqu’où la nécessité politique peut-elle aller dans la violation des règles de droit ? ».

Political career 
After finishing his graduate studies in 2009, he began to work in the office of Cabinet minister Didier Reynders as an advisor. At the same time, he worked as a legal assistant at the Facultés Universitaires Notre-Dame de la Paix in Namur and later was appointed the law practice officer at UMons.

In December 2011, following the creation of a new government, Bouchez again became an advisor to Reynders, who had been appointed Minister of Foreign Affairs.

Local politics 
At age 20, he ran in his first election, running as a member of the Mouvement Réformateur for local elections in 2006 in the city of Mons. Placed fourth on the party list, he received 397 votes, missing election by a few votes. In the 2010 elections, he was listed 8th on the MR's electoral list for the Senate.

In 2012, Bouchez was chosen by his colleagues in the MR to run at the top of the electoral list for communal elections in Mons. He received 2,550 votes and served as the Échevin for Budget, Finance, Employment and Sustainable Development for the city under Elio Di Rupo's PS-MR coalition.

During the 2014 regional elections Bouchez was listed as a first substitute on the MR list and received 4,535 votes. When Jacqueline Galant became federal minister of mobility, Bouchez became a Member of the Parliament of Wallonia and a member of the Parliament of the French Community of Belgium.

In April 2016, Jacqueline Galant resigned her role in the federal government following several controversies. Because Bouchez was Galant's substitute, he lost his seats in both parliaments following her return. Four days later, as Bouchez was set to return to his role as Échevin, Mons mayor Elio Di Rupo changed his coalition partner from the MR to the cdH, making Bouchez a communal councilor.

In June 2016, Bouchez became more involved in internal party politics. He joined the Centre Jean Gol, a liberal think tank, and worked to organize and brainstorm new policy ideas for the MR. At the Mouvement réformateur's 2016 policy convention, he fought against attempts by Louis Michel to get rid of compulsory voting, advocated for a universal basic income, increased taxation on robots taking peoples jobs, proposed a second round of elections so citizens could choose from possible coalition options, and advocated for the criminalization of those who praise the Nazi occupation of Belgium.

During the 2018 communal elections, rather than run under the Mouvement Reformateur, Bouchez formed a new opposition electoral alliance called  « Mons en Mieux ! » (Mons for the Better!). He was joined by members of the cdH (including Opaline Meunier), the PS and Ecolo, and the alliance was supported by the FGTB and CSC unions  The alliance received 22% of the vote, gaining 11 seats in the local council, with eight of the seats won by people under 35 years old (the most since 1994). Bouchez himself received the third largest number of first preference votes in the city (4,976 votes).

However, the PS and Ecolo decided to form a coalition, shutting Bouchez out of a leadership role locally.

Federal politics 
On March 19, 2019 Charles Michel, leader of the Mouvement Réformateur, named Bouchez as the party's spokesperson during the federal election campaign.

In the 2019 federal elections, Bouchez was placed fourth on the MR electoral list for Hennuyère constituency in Braine-le-Comte, a relatively safe area for the MR electorally. He received 16,522 votes in Hainaut province, the second highest number of first-preference votes. However, he was not elected due to vote transfers within the electoral system. Nevertheless, he became a co-opted Senator for the MR, getting sworn in on July 12, 2019. In the Senate, he worked with his colleagues to increase voting rights for Belgians living abroad in regional elections as well as increasing access to vaccines.

In October 2019, Bouchez was one of five candidates who ran to replace Charles Michel as leader of the  Mouvement Réformateur. On November 28, 2019, Bouchez was elected leader of the party, beating rival Denis Ducarme in the second round with 62% of the vote.

On December 10, 2019, Bouchez was appointed Informateur by King Philippe along with Joachim Coens, leader of CD&V, in an attempt to find a workable government coalition following the 2019 federal election. After being unable to find a solution, both men were discharged from their informateur duties on January 31, 2020.

Books 
 G.-L. Bouchez, L'aurore d'un monde nouveau, Éditions du CEP, 2017.

References

External links 
Le site web de Georges-Louis Bouchez
Le Mouvement réformateur
Le Groupe MR du Sénat

Members of the Parliament of the French Community
Members of the Parliament of Wallonia
Université libre de Bruxelles alumni
People from Frameries
Reformist Movement politicians
1986 births
Living people